Manikpur is a village in Muzaffarpur district, Bihar state, India. It is situated on the banks of a Himalayan glacier-fed perennial river, the Baya Nadi River, NH-102 Saraiya.

It is also known as Manikpur Estate because of a prominent family commonly known as Singh family which was started by Babu kodai prasad singh and led by his son Babu Rameshwar prasad singh and grand sons Babu Badri narayan singh and Babu Harishankar prasad singh.

History
Manikpur donated many acres of land to the landless in their region and many acres to the government for making High school, Middle school, Hospital and Gandak project in their region.

On 12 September 2020, BJP president J. P. Nadda visited Manikpur to meet with local farmers.

References 

Villages in Muzaffarpur district